Waterfalls is a live album by American saxophonist and composer John Klemmer featuring studio enhanced live performances recorded in Los Angeles for the Impulse! label.

Reception
The Allmusic review by Scott Yanow awarded the album 4 stars stating it is "Worth investigating by open-eared listeners".

Track listing
All compositions by John Klemmer
 "Prelude I" - 3:33 
 "Waterfalls" - 4:19 
 "Utopia: Man's Dream, Part 1" - 8:47 
 "Utopia: Man's Dream, Part 2" - 3:50 
 "There's Some Light Ahead" - 4:29 
 "Centrifugal Force" - 5:59 
 "Prelude II" - 4:02 
 "Waterfall II" - 6:08 
Recorded in performance at the Ash Grove in Los Angeles, California on June 17, 1972 and "enchanted" at The Village Recorder in Los Angeles on June 22, 1972

Personnel
John Klemmer - tenor saxophone, soprano saxophone, echoplex
Mike Nock - electric piano
Wilton Felder - electric bass
Eddie Marshall - drums
Victor Feldman - percussion
Diana Lee - vocals (tracks 3, 4 & 6)

References

Impulse! Records live albums
John Klemmer albums
1972 live albums